"Take a Long Line" is a song  by Australian hard rock group the Angels, released in July 1978 as the second single from their second album, Face to Face. The song peaked at number 29 on the Australian Kent Music Report.

In January 2018, as part of Triple M's "Ozzest 100", the 'most Australian' songs of all time, "Take a Long Line" was ranked number 35.

The song was largely written by band member Rick Brewster. In a 2018 interview with his brother and fellow band mate, John Brewster, on ABC Radio 774 in Melbourne, he said that many of the lyrics in the song were inspired by characters his brother had encountered on the streets of Kings Cross in Sydney. 

The year of its release (1978), The Angels supported both Meat Loaf and David Bowie on their respective tours of Australia. David Bowie actually asked the band to support him on his tour after hearing the Face to Face album and seeing The Angels live at a show at the Bondi Lifesaver club.

Track listing 
AP 11759
 "Take a Long Line"  (Doc Neeson, John Brewster, Rick Brewster) - 3:00
 "Love Takes Care" (Doc Neeson, John Brewster, Rick Brewster) - 3:34

Personnel 
 Doc Neeson – lead vocals
 Richard Brewster – lead guitar
 John Brewster – rhythm guitar
 Chris Bailey – bass guitar
 Graham "Buzz" Bidstrup – Drums
 The Angels, Mark Opitz - Producer

Charts

References 

The Angels (Australian band) songs
1978 songs
1978 singles
Songs written by Doc Neeson
Songs written by John Brewster (musician)
Albert Productions singles
Song recordings produced by Mark Opitz